Mursan is a town and a Nagar Panchayat in Hathras district in the Indian state of Uttar Pradesh. The primary spoken language is a dialect of Hindi, Braj Bhasha, which is closely related to Khariboli. In past, Raja Mahendra Pratap Singh was the ruler of Mursan. At present, the Chairman of Mursan is Rajnish Kushwaha.

Former Chairmen of Mursan:
 Lal Ji Saraswat
 Giriraj Kishor Sharma
 Deshraj Singh

Demographics
 India census, Mursan had a population of 11,550. Males constitute 54% of the population and females 46%. Mursan has an average literacy rate of 57%, lower than the national average of 59.5%: male literacy is 66%, and female literacy is 46%. In Mursan, 17% of the population is under 6 years of age.

Notable people
Raja Mahendra Pratap

Transport 
 By Roadways, there is a small government but stand in Mursan nearby Mursan Police Station.
 By Railways, there is one and only railway station in Mursan Town named as Mursan and station code is MSN.

Geography 

Nearby places

References

Cities and towns in Hathras district
Quasi-princely estates of India